António Fernando Amado Livramento (born 3 March 1982 in Tavira, Algarve) is a Portuguese former professional footballer who played as a midfielder.

References

External links

1982 births
Living people
People from Tavira
Portuguese footballers
Association football midfielders
Primeira Liga players
Liga Portugal 2 players
Segunda Divisão players
S.L. Benfica B players
S.C. Farense players
Louletano D.C. players
S.C. Olhanense players
C.D. Santa Clara players
Boavista F.C. players
Leixões S.C. players
Rio Ave F.C. players
F.C. Paços de Ferreira players
G.D. Chaves players
First Professional Football League (Bulgaria) players
PFC Beroe Stara Zagora players
PFC Slavia Sofia players
FC Lokomotiv 1929 Sofia players
Gibraltar Premier Division players
Lincoln Red Imps F.C. players
Portugal youth international footballers
Portuguese expatriate footballers
Expatriate footballers in Bulgaria
Expatriate footballers in Gibraltar
Portuguese expatriate sportspeople in Bulgaria
Portuguese expatriate sportspeople in Gibraltar
Sportspeople from Faro District